Keshavrao Sonawane (1925–2006) was an Indian politician, who served four terms in the Maharashtra Legislative Assembly, and was a Co-operative minister in Yashwantrao Chavan's cabinet and later Vasantrao Naik's cabinet during 1962–1967. He was elected as Member of Maharashtra Legislative Assembly for 4 times, twice from Latur constituency and twice from Ausa constituency.

Early life 
Keshavrao Sonavane was born in Mogarga of Ausa taluka in the farmer's family. Keshavrao Sonavane's father Sitaram Sonawane was a farmer who was follower of the Arya Samaj. According to the Arya Samaj all children should be well educated. Inspired by the teachings of Arya Samaj Keshavrao's Father Sitaram Sonavane decided to relocate his family to Latur for education of his children. Keshavrao got his primary education from Government High School Latur. After completing his primary education he moved to Hyderabad for pursuing Bachelor of Laws (LLB).
Keshavrao Sonawane, got his Bachelor of Laws (LLB) from Osmania University, Hyderabad.  After getting his Bachelor of Laws, he started his practice in the Latur district court. He was a criminal defence lawyer in Latur.

Political career 
Yashwantrao Chavan selected Keshavrao as a Congress party candidate for the position of Bombay Legislative Assembly Member from Latur Constituency. In 1957, Keshavrao ran for Bombay Legislative Assembly election from Latur Constituency and won the Bombay Legislative Assembly election by defeating Vithalrao Kelgaokar. Subsequently, he won the assembly election in 1962 from Latur Constituency by defeating   Ramchandra Govind and became the Co-operative Minister for Maharashtra state.

During his absence in Latur city while he was serving as a co-operative minister, opposition got stronger in the latur. because of this he had lost the assembly election from Latur Constituency in 1967 against socialist leader Bapu Kaldate.

Despite this huge setback, in 1972 he decided to stand for Maharashtra Legislative Assembly election from Ausa Constituency where he had very strong support in the form of his network of family members and relatives.  At the same time as a chief member of Maharashtra Pradesh Congress Committee he nominated Shivaraj Patil as his successor for the Latur Constituency seat after deciding to run for election from Ausa Constituency. This time he won the election against Madhav Patil and became the Member of Maharashtra Legislative Assembly from Ausa Constituency. Kashinath Jadhav of former Janata Dal had lost by the margin of three thousand votes to Keshavraoji Sonavane in 1977 assembly elections.

Elections Contested

Notable Works

Dalda Factory 
Dalda Factory was Asia's first oil mill set up on cooperative terms. Keshavrao was very actively involved in the establishment of Dalda Factory in Latur District. Dalda was major produce of the Latur region, for Dalda British Government had laid railway lines to Latur.

Maharashtra Agricultural Produce Marketing (Development & Regulation) Act, 1963
As a Co-operative minister of Maharashtra Keshavrao Sonawane created the draft of this Agricultural Produce Marketing Committee (APMC) act for the welfare of farmers in Maharashtra. Before passing this law, every market committee was having its own rules, this law made all market committees in Maharashtra to have single central administrative law under state control. Agricultural produce market committee (APMC) is a marketing board established by a state government in India. APMC ensures that farmers are not exploited by any intermediaries like Dalals/Traders/commission agents who compel farmers to sell their produce at the farm gate for an extremely low price. This APMC act mandates that all food produce should first be brought to a market yard and then sold through auction.

Dayanand Education Society 
Dayanand Education society was established in the year 1961 in the month of May.  Earlier Latur was small town in the Osmanabad District. Facilities for higher education were not available in the Latur so students were left with no option but going to cities like Hyderabad, Pune, and Mumbai and so on.

Student from middle class and lower-middle-class families were not able to afford the costs of education and other costs arising from the needs to live in the cities like Mumbai, Pune etc.  Higher education was rather like a dream for students from poor families.  So to make the higher education facilities accessible to children of farmers, agricultural laborers, workers; the dignitaries and business people like Manikrao Sonavane (elder brother of Keshavrao Sonawane), Chandrashekhar Bajpai, Ramgopalji Rathi and Keshavraoji Sonawane established Dayanand Education Society in the May month of year 1961

Manikraoji Sonavane, elder brother of Keshavrao and chairman of market committee, convinced the farmers of Latur to contribute to this cause.  Shri Keshavraoji Sonavane, Co-Operative Minister of the Maharashtra state, contributed to this cause by completing all required formal government procedures.

Terna Sugar Factory 
This is the first co-operative sugar factory in Osmanabad and Latur District. Formerly Latur was in Osmanabad District. Keshavraoji Sonavane brought this Sugar factory for Osmanabad and Latur District's farmers. It was beginning of the co-operative movement in the sugar industry started by keshavraoji Sonavane. Terna sugar factory was registered in 1965 with production capacity of 1250 Tons of Cane per Day. Currently terna has 3500 Tons of Cane per Day capacity.factory covers area of 3 talukas i.e. Osmanabad, Kallamb and Latur. This factory covers nearly 171 villages by area of operation.

Latur District Central Cooperative Bank Ltd. Latur 
Keshavraoji Sonavane was instrumental in the setup of Latur District Central Cooperative Bank. Latur DCC bank was developed during Keshavraoji's tenure in the government as Co-operative minister. Co-operative bank forms an integral part of banking system in India. As this bank operates mainly for the benefit of rural area, particularly the agricultural sector and Cooperative Banks in general and District Central Cooperative Banks in particular have to play major role in the upliftment of Economy. By creating Latur DCC bank Keshavrao made a very positive impact on agricultural sector and especially on the farmers of Latur and Osmanabad District.

District Bar Association, Latur 
Keshavrao Sonavane was a life member of District Bar Association, Latur. Vilasrao Deshmukh and Shivraj Patil were also life members of District Bar Association, Latur. Keshavrao Sonawane was President of Latur Bar Association for year 1960.

In Literature 
He was mentioned in books Uchalya (The Branded) by Laxman Gaikwad (1987), Yeravaḍā vidyāpīṭhātīla divasa by Kumāra Saptarshī and Māndiyāḷī by Ananta Bhālerāva (1994).Uchalya novel is an autobiographical account of the life of a stereotyped underdog but of a representative of a section of society thriving on petty crimes.

References 

1925 births
2006 deaths
People from Latur
People from Marathwada
Indian National Congress politicians
Maharashtra MLAs 1960–1962
Maharashtra MLAs 1962–1967
Maharashtra MLAs 1972–1978
State cabinet ministers of Maharashtra
Marathi politicians
Osmania University alumni
People from Latur district
Cooperatives in India